Myceligenerans xiligouense is a bacterium from the genus Myceligenerans which has been isolated from mud of Xiligou lake, Xiligou, Qinghai Province, China.

References

Further reading

External links
Type strain of Myceligenerans xiligouense at BacDive -  the Bacterial Diversity Metadatabase	

Micrococcales
Bacteria described in 2004